Tom Boardman may refer to:

Tom Boardman (racing driver) (born 1983), British racing driver
Tom Boardman, Baron Boardman (1919–2003), English Conservative politician and businessman